The Espanola Kings were a junior ice hockey team based in Espanola, Ontario, Canada. They played in the Greater Metro Junior 'A' Hockey League.

History
On February 18, 2007, Bob Russell announced the expansion of the Espanola Kings for the 2007-08 season . The announcement corresponded with two games that took place in Espanola between the King Wild and the Richmond Hill Rams franchises. The Kings are owned by the same ownership group as the Rams and were named after the 1970s Oak Ridges Kings of the Metro Junior B Hockey League.

The expansion of the Kings makes them the eighth team in the independent GMJHL and one of six 2007 expansion teams.

On September 7, 2007, the Espanola Kings played their first ever game in Elliot Lake against the Elliot Lake Bobcats.  The Bobcats defeated the Kings 3-2. On September 14, the Kings played their first ever home game, against the South Muskoka Shield. This resulted in a 6-4 victory — the Kings' first ever win.

After the 2009 GMHL Spring General Managers' meeting, it was announced that the Kings would not take part in the 2009-10 season. The Kings did not return, and nor did their sister franchise, Richmond Hill Rams.

Season-by-season standings

Playoffs
2008 Lost bye round
Temiscaming Royals defeated Espanola Kings 4-games-to-none in bye round
2009 Did not qualify

External links
Espanola Kings Webpage

Ice hockey teams in Ontario
Sport in Northern Ontario
2007 establishments in Ontario
2009 disestablishments in Ontario
Ice hockey clubs established in 2007
Ice hockey clubs disestablished in 2009